Ajarostaq (also Romanized as Ajārostāq; also known as Ajārestān) is a village in Tangeh Soleyman Rural District, Kolijan Rostaq District, Sari County, Mazandaran Province, Iran. At the 2006 census, its population was 314, in 93 families.

References 

Populated places in Sari County